The Madagascar Billie Jean King Cup team represents Madagascar in the Billie Jean King Cup tennis competition and are governed by the Fédération Malgache de Tennis.  They have not competed since 2018.

History
Madagascar competed in its first Fed Cup in 1997.  Their best result was winning Group II in their debut year.

See also
Fed Cup
Madagascar Davis Cup team

External links

Billie Jean King Cup teams
Fed Cup
Fed Cup